The Glade was a quarterly archery magazine published in the UK with a worldwide readership.

History
The magazine was started in 1978 by Ted Bradford.

Bought by Geoff and Paul Tittensor in 2008, The Glade was incorporated into Bow International magazine.

Regular Contributors 
Hugh Soar wrote about the longbow and its history.  Hugh is a well-known authority on the subject and has written several books including The Crooked Stick: A History of the Longbow (Weapons in History S.), Pub Westholme U.S, (2004), 

John Dudley wrote about the compound bow and the techniques of its use.  John Dudley, has earned the reputation as one of the best target archers in the world.

Richard Priestman wrote about the recurve bow and answers readers' questions about all aspects of archery.  Richard is a double Olympic bronze medalist.

Roy Nash wrote about how to get the best out of yourself and your equipment. Roy has been one of the top archers in the UK for many years.

References

External links
The Glade website

Archery in the United Kingdom
Defunct magazines published in the United Kingdom
Magazines established in 1978
Magazines with year of disestablishment missing
Quarterly magazines published in the United Kingdom
Sports magazines published in the United Kingdom